Victor Pastor (1937 – 2002) was a Monegasque businessman and one of the three heirs of the Monaco construction magnate Gildo Pastor.

Early life
He was born in Monaco, the son of the property developer Gildo Pastor.

Career
He founded Group Pastor.

In 1973, he was responsible for (assisted by his cousins Edmond and Jean-Antoine Pastor) the construction of the concert venue, Salle des Etoiles at Sporting Monte-Carlo, also known as the Summer Sporting Club. His sons Patrice and Jean-Victor have described this as "the most complicated and the most innovative project in the history of the family business", especially the "amazing slideback roof", which was "true technical prowess in those days". In 2014, Sporting d’Eté celebrated its 40th anniversary. The complex includes the nightclub Jimmy'z.

According to Bloomberg, the properties owned by Victor's branch of the Pastor family had a total value of $5.4 billion.

Personal life
He had four children:
 Philippe Pastor (1961-), artist
 Marie-Hélène (1965-)
 Jean-Victor Pastor (1968-), Director of  J.B. Pastor & Fils
 Patrice Pastor (1973-), Chairman of J.B. Pastor & Fils

References

1936 births
2002 deaths
Monegasque businesspeople in real estate
Monegasque billionaires
Victor
People of Ligurian descent